Cajueiro is a municipality located in the western of the Brazilian state of Alagoas. Its population is 21,331 (2020) and its area is 124 km². Its name comes from the Portuguese for the cashew tree — in the 19th century, a village began to form around such a tree, near the banks of the Paraíba river.

References

Municipalities in Alagoas